Bet Sima Synagogue or Vladivostok Synagogue (Russian : «Бейт Сима») is a Jewish synagogue in the Russian city of  Vladivostok and the only synagogue in Primorsky Krai. It is the oldest continuously operating synagogue in the Russian Far East.

The synagogue is located in the historic district of Vladivostok, on Praporchik Komarov St. For 70 years, the synagogue building was property of the Soviet authorities, but in 2005, the building was returned to the Jewish community and restored. It was rededicated as "Bet Sima".

History 
Until the 1917 February Revolution, Russian Jews had the ability (outside of the Pale of Settlement) to rent a building for use as a synagogue, without the right to own it. In 1911, the Jewish community of Vladivostok was about 160 men, and had a synagogue located at 19 Komarovska Street (today 5 Praporchik Komarov Street).

It was Léonti (Leïb) Semïonovitch (Chimanovitch) Skidelski (1845—1916) who built what is now Bet Sima Synagogue. He was a trader with the first guild, an honorary citizen of Vladivostok, sponsor of the Society of Study of the Amur Region and a patron of industry in Ussuri krai.

On October 5, 1916, three days before his death, Skidelski laid the first stone for the "Synagogue of the Jewish Community of Vladivostok" (the name used at the time) near the previous location of the community. The construction was funded by private donations. At the time, Jews often had to ask permission to build a private building and then ask permission to use it as a house of prayer. By 1917, Judaism was legalized in Russia and the existing synagogue was allowed to operate as a place of worship, owned by the Jewish community.

At the end of 1932 the synagogue was closed by Soviet authorities, and the Jewish community was dissolved by law. The synagogue building was given to Vladivostok Confectionary Factory in 1933, first as a club and later as the store for the factory. The factory had the building until the early 1990s.

In 1996, the building was declared an architectural monument of regional value.

Renaissance 
On September 8, 2004 Sergei Darkine, Governor of Primorsky Krai, presented Chief Rabbi Berel Lazar with the legal documents giving the rights to use the building for free in perpetuity. The Federation of Jewish Communities of Russia later transferred that right to the local Jewish community in 2005. In February 2013 Shimon Varakin, Rabbi of Primorsky Krai and Vladivostok announced plans to renovate the synagogue based on new plans. The Jewish community in Vladivostok, which numbered about 300 at the time, received support from a businessman in Moscow for the project.

In autumn 2013, the renovations began, finishing in June 2014.

The re-dedication of the synagogue took place on December 18, 2015. The synagogue was renamed "Bet Sima" in honor of the mother of banker Vladimir Kogan, Seraphime (Sima) Kogan.

References

External links 

 (ru) Jewish Community of Vladivostok Еврейский Владивосток 
 (ru) Synagogue of Vladivostok Владивостокская синагога

20th-century synagogues
Jews and Judaism in Siberia
Synagogues in Russia
Buildings and structures in Vladivostok
Cultural heritage monuments of regional significance in Primorsky Krai